The superficial epigastric vein is a vein which travels with the superficial epigastric artery. It joins the accessory saphenous vein near the fossa ovalis.

Additional images

External links
  - "Anterior Abdominal Wall: Blood Vessels in the Superficial Fascia"
 

Veins of the lower limb